Thailand participated in the 2018 Asian Games in Jakarta and Palembang, Indonesia as a competing nation, from 18 August to 2 September 2018. This is the nation's eighteenth appearance at the Asian Games, since the inaugural games in New Delhi.

Background

Arrangement
Thana Chaiprasit or Big Tom is set to be the chef de mission of Thailand in the 2018 Asian Games, after being the chef de mission of Thailand in previous Olympic Games, Asian Games and Southeast Asian Games.

Thailand participated at the test of event of the Games with 92 athletes and 33 officials from Athletic, Basketball, Boxing, Pencak silat, Weightlifting and Archery in February 2018, and in August 2018, the country will send 830 athletes (445 male and 385 female).

Target
Sakol Wannapong or "Big Seu", Governor of the Sports Authority of Thailand set the target for the Thailand Asian Games team to be awarded 20 gold medals and no less than Incheon games (12 gold medals). According to Somphorn Wannasriri, Director of Sports Science Department on behalf of Sports Authority of Thailand (SAT), the country is aim to win 17 gold, 15 silver, and 28 bronze medals from 46 sport disciplines.

Media coverage
The Workpoint Entertainment is the first private who hold the broadcast rights of the 2018 Asian Games in Thailand. They will live the opening ceremony until the closing ceremony in Gelora Bung Karno Stadium, by 4 platforms including Workpoint TV, Workpoint Facebook Fanpage, Workpoint YouTube Channel and Workpoint Line Account.

Medal summary

Medals by sport

Medals by day

Medalists

The following Thailand competitors won medals at the Games.

Multiple medallists
The following Thailand competitors won several medals at the 2018 Asian Games.

Archery

The National Archery Association of Thailand will enter fourteen archers (eight men and six women archers) into the Asian Games tournament.

Men's

Women's

Mixed's

Athletics

The Athletics Association of Thailand will enter sixty athletes (thirty-three men and twenty-seven women athletes) into the Asian Games tournament.

Men's

Track & road events

Field events

Combined events – Decathlon

Women's

Track & road events

Field events

Combined events – Heptathlon

Mixed

Track & road events

Badminton

The Badminton Association of Thailand will enter twenty badminton players (ten men and ten women badminton players) into the Asian Games tournament.

Men's

Women's

Mixed's

Baseball

The Amateur Baseball Association of Thailand entered Thailand national baseball team into the Asian Games tournament.

 Summary

Roster
The following is the Thailand squad in the men's baseball tournament of the 2018 Asian Games. The team consists of 21 players.

Round 1

Round 2 – Group A

Consolation round

Basketball

Summary

5x5 basketball
The Basketball Sport Association of Thailand will enter Thailand men's and women's national basketball team.

Men's tournament

Roster
The following is the Thailand roster in the men's basketball tournament of the 2018 Asian Games.

Group play

Women's tournament

Roster
The following is the Thailand roster in the women's basketball tournament of the 2018 Asian Games.

Group play

Quarter-finals

5–8th place semifinals

3x3 basketball
Thailand national 3x3 team will participate in the Games. The men's team placed in pool A, and the women's team in pool C based on the FIBA 3x3 federation ranking.

Men's tournament

Roster
The following is the Thailand roster in the men's 3x3 basketball tournament of the 2018 Asian Games.
Chatpol Chungyampin
Chanatip Jakrawan
Guntapong Korsah Dick
Nithipol Sawathavorn

Group play

Quarter-finals

Semifinals

Bronze medal game

Women's tournament

Roster
The following is the Thailand roster in the women's 3x3 basketball tournament of the 2018 Asian Games.

Group play

Quarter-finals

Semifinals

Bronze medal game

Bowling

The Thai Tenpin Bowling Association will enter twelve bowlers (six men and six women bowlers) into the Asian Games tournament.

Men's

Trios and Team of 6

Masters

Women's

Trios and Team of 6

Masters

Boxing

The Thailand Boxing Association will enter ten boxers (seven men and three women boxers) into the Asian Games tournament.

Men's

Women's

Bridge

The Contract Bridge League of Thailand will enter twenty-four contract bridge players (fourteen men and eight women contract bridge players) into the Asian Games tournament.

Men

Women

Mixed

Canoeing

The Rowing & Canoeing Association of Thailand will enter fifty-four canoeists and rowers. (27 men and 27 women canoeists and rowers) into the Asian Games tournament.

Slalom

Sprint

Traditional boat race

Sprint

Men's
Kasemsit Borriboonwasin
Praison Buasamrong
Chanrit Chakkhian
Wattana Chitphantulap
Phanuphong Jiranarongchai
Nattawut Kaewsri
Nares Naoprakon
Yutthana Porananon
Thiraphong Ratkhamhaeng
Thoedsak Sonthi
Aditep Srichart

Women's
Thanyaluk Aoenthachai
Kunyatad Boonma
Kanittha Nennoo
Kantida Nurun
Jirawan Phaophandee
Wararat Plodpai
Jitsupa Prakobtam
Orasa Thiangkathok
Porncharus Yamprasert

Traditional boat race

Men's
Chaiyakarn Choochuen
Laor Iamluek
Boonsong Imtim
Santas Mingwongyang
Asdawut Mitilee
Phawonrat Roddee
Vinya Seechomchuen
Pornchai Tesdee
Wasan Upalasueb
Natthawat Waenphrom
Tanawoot Waipinid
Pakdee Wannamanee
Ekkapong Wongunjai

Women's
Nattakan Boonruang
Jaruwan Chaikan
Jariya Kankasikam
Praewpan Kawsri
Saowanee Khamsaeng
Suphatthra Kheha
Mintra Mannok
Pranchalee Moonkasem
Patthama Nanthain
Nipaporn Nopsri
Arisara Pantulap
Nipatcha Pootong
Prapaporn Pumkhunthod
Wanida Thammarat

Cycling

The Thai Cycling Association will enter thirty-seven cyclists. (23 men and 14 women cyclists) into the Asian Games tournament.

BMX

Mountain biking

Road

Men's
Turakit Boonratanathanakorn
Thanakhan Chaiyasombat
Peerapol Chawchiangkwang
Navuti Liphongyu
Sarawut Sirironnachai

Women's
Chaniporn Batriya
Phetdarin Somrat

Track

Men's
Jai Angsuthasawit
Turakit Boonratanathanakorn
Kapunya Worayut
Navuti Liphongyu
Yuttana Mano
Jaturong Niwanti
Warut Paekrathok
Patompob Phonarjthan
Phuchong Saiudomsin
Satjakul Sianglam
Sarawut Sirironnachai
Pongthep Tapimay

Women's
Watinee Luekajorn
Jutatip Maneephan
Chanpeng Nontasin
Supaksorn Nuntana
Pannaray Rasee

Diving

The Thailand Swimming Association entered four divers into the Asian Games tournament.

Men

Equestrian

The Thailand Equestrian Federation will enter eleven equestrians (5 men and 6 women equestrians) into the Asian Games tournament.

Dressage

Eventing

Jumping

Esports (demonstration) 

Arena of Valor

Hearthstone and StarCraft II

Fencing

The Amateur Fencing Association of Thailand will enter eighteen fencers. (ten men and eight women fencers) into the Asian Games tournament.

Men's

Women's

Field hockey

The Thai Hockey Association entered Thailand men's and women's national hockey team into the Asian Games tournament.

 Summary

Men's tournament 

Roster

Pool B

Ninth place game

Women's tournament 

Roster

Pool B

Fifth place game

Football

The Football Association of Thailand will enter Thailand men's and women's national football team into the Asian Games tournament.
 Summary

Men's tournament 

Thailand competed in the group B at the men's team event.
Roster

 Group play

Women's tournament 

Thailand competed in the group C at the women's team event.
Roster

 Group play

Quarter-final

Golf

The Thailand Golf Association will enter seven golfers (4 men and 3 women golfers) into the Asian Games tournament.

Men's

Women's

Gymnastics

The Gymnastics Association of Thailand will enter eleven gymnasts. (5 men and 6 women gymnasts) into the Asian Games tournament.

Artistic

Men's

Team

Individual

Women's

Team

Individual

Rhythmic

Team

Individual

Handball 

The Handball association of Thailand will enter Thailand women's national handball team into the Asian Games tournament.

Summary

Women's tournament 

Thailand will compete in group B at the women's team event.
Roster

 Group play

Semifinals

Bronze medal game

Jet ski

The Jet Ski Association of Thailand will enter eight jet-skiers into the Asian Games tournament.

Judo

The Judo Association of Thailand will enter ten judoka. (4 men and 6 women judokas) into the Asian Games tournament.

Men's

Women's

Ju-jitsu

The Ju-jitsu Association of Thailand will enter fourteen ju-jitsu athletes (10 men and 4 women ju-jitsu athletes) into the Asian Games tournament.

Men's

Women's

Kabaddi 

Summary

Men's tournament

Team roster

Khunakon Chanjaroen
Rittichai Jaisai
Khomsan Thongkham
Teerasak Khunsan
Somboon Asa
Pramot Saising
Sasithon Rungsawang
Worawut Chuaikoed
Phuwanai Wannasaen
Janwit Diskanan
Santi Bunchoet
Kittichai Kanket

Group A

Women's tournament

Team roster

Alisa Limsamran
Namfon Kangkeeree
Nuntarat Nuntakitkoson
Kamontip Suwanchana
Wassana Rachmanee
Saowapa Chueakhao
Atchara Puangngern
Charinda Yindee
Panthida Khamthat
Kannika Munmai
Bencharat Khwanchai
Naleerat Ketsaro

Group A

Semifinals

Karate 

Thailand participated in the karate competition at the Games with eight athletes (4 men's and 4 women's).

Kurash 

Men

Women

Modern pentathlon

Paragliding

Men's

Women's

Pencak silat

Men's
Seni

Tanding

Women's
Seni

Tanding

Roller sports

Skateboarding

Speed skating

Rowing 

Men

Women

Rugby sevens 

Thailand rugby sevens men's team drawn in group A, while the women's team entered the group B.

Men's tournament 

Squad
The following is the Thailand squad in the men's rugby sevens tournament of the 2018 Asian Games.

Head coach: Tanyavit Kuasint

Khomchak Chakrabandhu Na Ayudhaya
Sarut Janda
Warongkorn Khamkoet
Noppasit Kradkrayang
Klin Laksanasompong
Sichon Nakarin
Puvadol Palukpetch
Panupong Puangpun
Wuttipong Sakunthingthong
Sumet Thammaporn
Akarin Thitisakulvit
Chatree Wannadit

Group A

Quarterfinal

Classification semifinal (5–8)

Seventh place game

Women's tournament 

Squad
The following is the Thailand squad in the women's rugby sevens tournament of the 2018 Asian Games.

Head coach:  Tetsuhiro Onaka

Butsaya Bunrak
Piyamat Chomphumee
Thanaporn Huankid
Uthumporn Liamrat
Wannaree Meechok
Ruksina Navakaew
Jeeraporn Peerabunanon
Tidarat Sawatnam
Rasamee Sisongkham
Thanachporn Wandee
Rattanaporn Wittayaronnayut
Chitchanok Yusri

Group B

Quarterfinal

Semifinal

Bronze medal game

Sailing

Men

Women

Mixed

Sambo

Sepak takraw 

The Takraw Association of Thailand will enter four events from six events into the Asian Games tournament. The four events will be Men's duo regu, Men's team, Women's duo regu and Women's team. This will be the first time that Thailand enter duo regu events in twelve years after the host rejected the regu events. Thai's sepak takraw team will consist of 27 athletes (15 men's and 12 female) under coach Kamon Tankimhong. Thailand target with four gold medals.

Men's

Women's

Shooting

Men's

Women's

Mixed's

Soft tennis

Sport climbing 

Speed

Speed relay

Combined

Squash 

Singles

Team

Swimming

Men's

Women's

Mixed's

Table tennis

Men's 
Singles

Team

Women's 
Singles

Team

Mixed's

Taekwondo

Kyorugi

Poomsae

Tennis 

Men

Women

Mixed

Triathlon

Volleyball

Beach

Indoor
Summary

Men's tournament

Team roster
The following is the Thai roster in the men's volleyball tournament of the 2018 Asian Games.

Head coach: Monchai Supajirakul

Group play

Playoffs

Classification 7th–12th

7th–10th semifinals

7th place match

Women's tournament

Team roster
The following is the Thai roster in the women's volleyball tournament of the 2018 Asian Games.

Head coach: Danai Sriwatcharamethakul

Group play

Quarter-finals

Semifinals

Gold medal game

Water polo

Summary

Women's tournament

Team roster
The following is the Thai roster in the women's water polo tournament of the 2018 Asian Games.

Round robin

Weightlifting

Men's

Women's

Wrestling

Men's freestyle

Men's Greco-Roman

Women's freestyle

Wushu

Men's taolu

Men’s sanda

Women’s sanda

References

External links
 

Nations at the 2018 Asian Games
2018
Asian Games